S. Peter Alphonse is an Indian politician. He is the current Chairman of State Minorities Commission, Tamilnadu. He was elected to Tamil Nadu legislative assembly twice from Tenkasi constituency in 1989 and 1991 elections as an Indian National Congress candidate. He was elected to Tamil Nadu legislative assembly again as an Indian National Congress candidate from Kadayanallur constituency in 2006 election.

References 

Indian National Congress politicians from Tamil Nadu
Living people
Year of birth missing (living people)
Tamil Nadu MLAs 1991–1996
Tamil Maanila Congress politicians